The Max Planck Institute for Human Cognitive and Brain Sciences is located in Leipzig, Germany. The institute was founded in 2004 by a merger between the former Max Planck Institute of Cognitive Neuroscience in Leipzig and the Max Planck Institute for Psychological Research in Munich. It is one of 86 institutes in the Max Planck Society (Max Planck Gesellschaft).

Departments 

 Neuropsychology - Director: Professor Angela D. Friederici
 Neurology - Director: Professor Arno Villringer
 Neurophysics - Director: Professor Nikolaus Weiskopf
 Psychology - Director: Professor Christian Doeller

Former Departments 
 Social Neuroscience - Director: Professor Tania Singer
 Neurophysics - Director: Professor Robert Turner
 Psychology - Director: Professor Wolfgang Prinz
 Cognitive Neurology - Director: Professor D. Yves von Cramon

References

External links 
 Homepage of the Max Planck Institute for Human Cognitive and Brain Sciences

2004 establishments in Germany
Human Cognitive and Brain Sciences
Cognitive science research institutes